Denise Bombardier  (born January 18, 1941 in Montreal, Quebec) is a journalist, essayist, novelist and media personality who worked for the French-language television station Radio-Canada for over 30 years.

Bombardier is noted for her standard French, in particular her European-norm pronunciation. She is a defender of the international Francophonie and has often been invited by Bernard Pivot to discuss the psyche of the French and the situation of the French language in France.

Biography
Bombardier obtained a master's degree in political science from the Université de Montréal in 1971 and a doctorate in sociology three years later from the Sorbonne.

She began her professional career as a research assistant on the Radio-Canada television program Aujourd'hui. Starting in 1975 she hosted a number of programs such as Présent international, Hebdo-dimanche, Noir sur blanc (1979–1983), Le Point and Entre les lignes. She hosted Trait-d'union from 1987 to 1988, and participated on Aujourd'hui dimanche (1988–1991) and L'Envers de la médaille.

Noir sur blanc was the first public affairs program to be hosted by a woman in Quebec. There Bombardier interviewed Prime Minister of Canada Pierre Trudeau, novelist Georges Simenon, Prime Minister of Israel Golda Meir, President of France Valéry Giscard d'Estaing and his successor François Mitterrand.

In 1999, she hosted and produced the science program Les Années lumières on Radio-Canada radio.

She has written a number of articles in the press, some of which have been controversial. Her articles have appeared in Le Monde, Le Devoir, L'Express de Toronto, Châtelaine, Le Point and L'Actualité.

She has written La Voix de la France (1975), Une enfance à l'eau bénite (1985), Aimez-moi les uns les autres (1999), Nos chères amies (2008), or more recently L'énigmatique Céline Dion (2009).

In 2003, she was fired via e-mail from the public television network Radio-Canada for engaging in a debate on same-sex marriage against Louis Godbout, spokesperson for the Quebec Gay Archives, during an interview-format segment of Le Point, an evening information show. She has been scathing about reality television programs, especially Quebec's Star Académie.

In 2007, Bombardier wrote the song La Diva for Celine Dion, included on the album D'Elles. She also followed Celine Dion during her Taking Chances World Tour as research for her book L'énigmatique Céline Dion.

Views 
In 1990, during a television confrontation on a French book programme "Apostrophes", Bombardier said of the writer Gabriel Matzneff: "Some older men like to attract little children with sweets. Mr Matzneff does it with his reputation."

She added, "How did they do afterward, these young girls?"

At the time, she was insulted in the press. But, in January 2020, writer and editor Vanessa Springora "publishes a book, Le Consentement, a memoir of having been sexually abused by Matzneff between the ages of 14 and 16, when he was more than three times her age. It sparks an international furore, and Matzneff, driven from Paris, takes refuge on the Italian Riviera. The Paris prosecutor’s office opens an investigation after an “analysis” of the book. Matzneff is set to stand trial in September this year," reports the Guardian.

In 2019, Bombardier wrote the column "The Decline of the Whites." She started by noting the demographic fact that in many US cities, whites are already in the minority, and she stated that by 2050, in such countries as Canada, New Zealand and the US, whites could become a minority group.

Bibliography 
 La Voix de la France (1975)
 Une enfance à l'eau bénite (1985)
 Le mal de l'âme (with Claude Saint-Laurent, 1989)
 Tremblement de cœur (1990)
 La déroute des sexes (1993)
 Nos hommes (1995)
 Aimez-moi les uns les autres (1999)
 Lettre ouverte aux Français qui se croient le nombril du monde (2000)
 Propos d'une moraliste (2003)
 Et quoi encore! (2004)
 Sans complaisance (2005)
 Nos chères amies (2008)
 L'énigmatique Céline Dion (2009)
  L'Anglais  (2012)
   Une vie sans peur et sans regret. Mémoires (2019)

Selected filmography 
 Présent international
 Hebdo-dimanche
 Noir sur blanc
 Point
 Entre les lignes.
 Trait-d'union (1987–1988)
 Aujourd'hui dimanche (1988–1991)
 L'Envers de la médaille
 Parlez-moi des hommes, parlez-moi des femmes (2001–2002)

Awards and recognition
 In 1993 she was made a Knight of the Légion d'honneur
 In 2000 she was made a Knight of the National Order of Quebec
 In 2015 she was made a Member of the Order of Canada

In media
Bombardier championed Next Episode by Hubert Aquin (translation of Prochain épisode by Sheila Fischman) in Canada Reads 2003. In the 2007 edition of Canada Reads, an "all-star" competition pitting the five winning advocates from previous years against each other, Bombardier returned to champion Gabrielle Roy's novel Children of My Heart.

References

External links

  Souvenirs, vol. 1, n° 1, Les Éditions Télémédia Inc., 1989.

1941 births
Living people
Canadian television journalists
Canadian radio journalists
French Quebecers
Knights of the National Order of Quebec
Université de Montréal alumni
Canadian women television journalists
Journalists from Montreal
Members of the Order of Canada
Canadian women radio journalists
Quebec sovereigntists
Quebecor people
Conservatism in Canada